Waitangi River  is the name of two rivers in the far north of New Zealand's North Island.
 Waitangi River (Far North District)
 Waitangi River (Whangarei District)